Charles Brown was mayor of Murray, Utah from 1906 to 1909.  He was the first mayor of Murray to serve two terms. From 1898 to 1933 he engaged in the grocery business in Murray.  He was active in the LDS Church serving a church mission to California from 1896 to 1898. He was a graduate of Murray city public schools and Brigham Young University.   During his tenure in office Murray started construction on sidewalks, street lighting, roads, and a city hall.

References 

1873 births
1943 deaths
Latter Day Saints from Utah
Brigham Young University alumni
Mayors of Murray, Utah
American Mormon missionaries in the United States
19th-century Mormon missionaries